Charles Anthony van Straubenzee (born 1988) is an English businessman and investment executive.

Early life and education 
Charlie van Straubenzee is the son of Alexander van Straubenzee, circulation manager for The Spectator, and Claire Fenwick, daughter of Anthony Fenwick, of Eaton Grange, Grantham, Lincolnshire. He is a grandson of Lieutenant-Colonel Henry van Straubenzee. His elder brother is Thomas van Straubenzee. In 2002 his elder brother, Henry, was killed in a car accident.

Van Straubenzee attended Ludgrove School, where he became a close friend of Prince Harry, Duke of Sussex, and William, Prince of Wales. He graduated from the University of Newcastle upon Tyne in 2010.

Career 
Van Straubenzee worked for Jupiter Asset Management in sales team servicing for stockbrokers, family offices, and multi-managers. He joined the investment company Brown Advisory in August 2011. He currently serves as the head of the United Kingdom financial intermediaries and is part of the institutional sales and business development team at Brown Advisory for international business.

Personal life 
Van Straubenzee served as best man at the wedding of Prince Harry and Meghan Markle.

Van Straubenzee married Daisy Jenks on 4 August 2018 at the Church of St. Mary the Virgin in Frensham. Prince Harry reportedly served as best man at Van Straubenzee's wedding. The ceremony was also attended by Meghan, Duchess of Sussex, Princess Eugenie of York, and Jack Brooksbank. He is a godfather to Prince Archie of Sussex.
The couple have two children, Clover Kitty van Straubenzee (born 26 February 2020) and Henry Alexander van Straubenzee (born 10 October 2021).

References 

Living people
English people of Belgian descent
English people of Dutch descent
English investors
Alumni of Newcastle University
People educated at Ludgrove School
Charlie
1988 births